Ernest Courant (March 26, 1920 – April 21, 2020) was an American accelerator physicist and a fundamental contributor to modern large-scale particle accelerator concepts. His most notable discovery was his 1952 work with Milton S. Livingston and Hartland Snyder on the Strong focusing principle, a critical step in the development of modern particle accelerators like the synchrotron, though this work was preceded by that of Nicholas Christofilos.

Courant was a member of the National Academy of Sciences, and remained active as a distinguished scientist emeritus at Brookhaven National Laboratory. He played a part in the work of Brookhaven for sixty years and had also been mentor to several generations of students. In this kind of generative academic influence, he can be compared to his father, the mathematician  Richard Courant. He turned 100 in March 2020 and died the following month.

Early life
Courant was born March 26, 1920 in Göttingen, Germany, the first of four children of Richard Courant and Nerina Runge Courant, a year after their marriage.

He wrote that he "came by science naturally". His mother's father, Carl Runge, is credited with the Runge-Kutta method for numerical solutions of differential equations. A maternal great-grandfather (Runge's father-in-law ) was Emil DuBois-Reymond, a pioneer in electrophysiology. Affinity for science and mathematics extended further than his biological family. Ernest Courant's childhood neighbors included the mathematician David Hilbert (his father's thesis director, in whose honor Ernest received the middle name of David) and the physicists Max Born and James Franck. Further, his father's students and colleagues became friends of the family, and often visited.

Ernest's early interests centered on chemistry. "I had a lab at home full of test tubes, Bunsen burners, and chemicals. Once there was a small fire (easily put out), but I got a sense of how things were put together."

Adolf Hitler came to power in 1933, and the neighborhood and its intellectual society were disrupted—along with the mathematics department at the University. Ernest's father had been born to a Jewish family of small businessmen, and he was now identified as a Jew, and an undesirable, by the new regime. Expelled from his position at the University of Göttingen,  Richard Courant took a temporary teaching position in England, and the family abandoned Göttingen in favor of Cambridge for a few months. Forewarned by a Nazi acquaintance that the anti-Semitic storm would not settle but intensify, the family made plans to emigrate permanently. They returned only briefly to Germany before embarking to New York City, where his father had secured a post at New York University—and immigration visas to the US. Ernest became an American citizen in 1940.

Fluent in English from both early lessons and the recent period enrolled at the Perse School in Cambridge, Ernest was accepted at the Fieldston School of the School for Ethical Culture, with a scholarship, thanks to intervention by family friend (and Fieldston alumnus), J. Robert Oppenheimer.

Career
Courant graduated from the Fieldston School in 1936, received a physics degree from Swarthmore College, and earned a Ph.D. in physics from the University of Rochester in 1943.

Courant worked at Brookhaven National Laboratory from 1948, first as an associate scientist in the Proton Synchrotron Division.  He received tenure in 1955, and was promoted to senior scientist in 1960.  In addition, he taught as an adjunct professor at Stony Brook University from 1966 to 1986.

Together with Hartland Snyder, he developed the Courant–Snyder parameters, a method for analyzing the distribution of particles in an accelerator or beam line.

Honors
 2007 University of Rochester distinguished scholar award
 1987 First Annual Robert R. Wilson Prize of the American Physical Society
 1986 Enrico Fermi Award from the Department of Energy, USA
 Boris Pregal Prize of the New York Academy of Sciences

References and further reading

External links
Courant, E.D., "Accelerators, Colliders, and Snakes (2003)", Annu. Rev. Nucl. Part. Sci. 2003.53:1-37

1920 births
2020 deaths
21st-century American physicists
American centenarians
Men centenarians
American nuclear physicists
Accelerator physicists
Members of the United States National Academy of Sciences
Enrico Fermi Award recipients
Brookhaven National Laboratory staff
German people of Jewish descent
American people of German-Jewish descent
German emigrants to the United States
People with acquired American citizenship